Lorenzo León Alvarado (31 May 1928 – 17 February 2020) was a Peruvian Catholic bishop.

León Alvarado was born in Peru and was ordained to the priesthood in 1952. He served as Bishop of Huacho from 1967 to 2003. He died on 17 February 2020.

Notes

1928 births
2020 deaths
20th-century Roman Catholic bishops in Peru
21st-century Roman Catholic bishops in Peru
Roman Catholic bishops of Huacho